Utstikkar Glacier is a broad glacier flowing north from the vicinity of Moyes Peak in Antarctica and terminating in Utstikkar Glacier Tongue between Utstikkar Bay to the east and Allison Bay to the west.
The glacier was mapped and named Utstikkarbreen (the out-jutting glacier) by Norwegian cartographers working from aerial photographs taken by the Lars Christensen Expedition in January–February 1937.

See also
 List of glaciers in the Antarctic
 Glaciology

References
 

Glaciers of Mac. Robertson Land